Sultanpur or State of Sultanpur (ریاست سُلطانپُور) was a Muslim (Non Salute) Princely State in the days of British Raj and ruled by the Sultan tribe of Rajputs, Located in the Rawalpindi District in the Punjab Province of Pakistan. The State was named after it's founder Sultan Byzaid, the Sultan family ruled the state from 1809 to 1950. It had a population of 1,083 in 1901, yielding a state revenue of 8,746 Rupees (mostly from land),
The state was founded in 1809 when Ranjit Singh, The Ruler of the Sikh Empire granted the area to Sultan Byzaid Khan who formed The State of Sultanpur. There was some uncertainty to whether Sultanpur was ranked as a full princely state in India, until then it had status of a Vassal State. Sultanpur had been under suzerainty of the Sikh Empire until 1850, when it accepted a British protectorate, entering into a subsidiary alliance with British India.

In 1947, soon after the British had departed from the Indian subcontinent, the last ruler of Sultanpur Sultan Sher Zaman signed an Instrument of Accession to the new Dominion of Pakistan, and Sultanpur was a princely state of Pakistan from then until August 1950, when it was incorporated into the Punjab Province.

The territory covered by the state remains part of the present-day Punjab, as a Union Council.

Rulers
The all rulers bore title of Sultan

 Sultan Byzaid Khan 1809-1837
 Sultan Atif Zaman 1837-1845
 Sultan Muhammad Ali Khan 1845-1873
 Sultan Sham Sher 1873-1894
 Sultan Ghulam Nabi 1894-1914
 Sultan Ahmed Khan 1914-1939
 Sultan Sher Zaman 1939-1950 (State Abolished)